On June 28, 2017, East Los Angeles College Foundation (ELACF) established the East Los Angeles College Alumni Association with the purpose of supporting the overall advancement of East Los Angeles College (ELAC) by engaging alumni, building a culture of philanthropy among the Husky Family and being the representative voice for ELAC alumni.

History
Since its establishment in 1945, East Los Angeles College has been responsible for providing academic and career services and opportunities to thousands of students, many of which hail from the surrounding communities of Monterey Park and East Los Angeles and currently boasts an enrollment of over 34,000. 

During its seventy-year existence, the college has played an enormous role in building and reaching out to local citizens, many of whom have become well-established in their respective fields, some of which include L.A. Mayor Antonio Villaraigosa and artist Kent Twitchell. The purpose of the Alumni association is to ensure that all of its graduates stay connected with the college and continually contribute to its growth even after their transition to mainstream universities, careers, and occupations. In addition, the Alumni Association encourages students to live and realize the motto of the college "Start at ELAC."

Leadership
As an auxiliary organization of the ELAC Foundation, the 2017-2018 executive board members include President Maria Elena Yepes, Vice President Felipe Agredano, Secretary Raul Corral, and Treasurer Lynnette Dolatre. Founding Board of Directors of the Alumni Association include: Elizabeth Arroyo, Paul Chang, Jennifer Estrada, Jimmy Kenny, Frank Lozano, Alexis Navarro, Ana Osio, Al Rios, Emiliano Sauceda, Mario Villegas, and Armando Yepes.

References

Non-profit organizations based in California